The Cormorant Lakes are a series of freshwater lakes situated in North Western Minnesota. The Lakes include Cormorant Lake (Minnesota), Little Cormorant Lake, Upper Cormorant Lake, and Middle Cormorant Lake. The lakes are located in Becker County, Minnesota.

References

Lakes of Becker County, Minnesota
Lakes of Minnesota